Albert Schaller (May 20, 1857 – March 31, 1934) was an American jurist, politician, and businessman.

Born in Long Grove, Illinois, The Schaller family moved to Hastings Minnesota on July 4 of that year. Schaller attended secondary school in France. Schaller received his bachelor's degree from St. Vincent's College in Cape Girardeau, Missouri and his law degree from Washington University School of Law in 1879. Schaller practiced law in Hastings, Minnesota and was the Hastings City Attorney and the city attorney for South St. Paul, Minnesota. He married Katherine Elizabeth (Kate) Meloy of Hastings and they had five children; four lived to adulthood – Rosemarie, Karl, Marion, and Josephine. He was also county attorney for Dakota County, Minnesota. Schaller served in the Minnesota State Senate from 1895 to 1915 and was a Democrat. In March 1915, Schaller was appointed to the Minnesota Supreme Court and served until January 1917. Schaller resumed his law practice in Saint Paul, Minnesota and Hastings, Minnesota. Schaller died in Hastings, Minnesota and is buried in the family plot in Guardian Angels Cemetery in Hastings.

Notes

1857 births
1934 deaths
Politicians from Chicago
People from Hastings, Minnesota
Washington University School of Law alumni
Justices of the Minnesota Supreme Court
Democratic Party Minnesota state senators
People from South St. Paul, Minnesota
Politicians from Saint Paul, Minnesota